Graignes-Mesnil-Angot is a commune in the Manche department in north-western France.

It was formed on 28 February 2007 by the merger of Graignes and Le Mesnil-Angot.

See also
Communes of the Manche department

References

Graignesmesnilangot